Patrick B. Weiler  (born April 30, 1986) is a Canadian politician who was elected to represent the riding of West Vancouver—Sunshine Coast—Sea to Sky Country in the House of Commons of Canada in the 2019 Canadian federal election.

Early life 
He was born in West Vancouver, British Columbia and raised in West Vancouver and Sechelt, British Columbia. His father is UBC law professor Joe Weiler and his mother is former Sechelt municipal councillor Beverly Tanchak.

He was an environmental and natural resource management lawyer.

His work included working with governments around the globe to improve the management of aquatic ecosystems, and improving governance of natural resource sectors on behalf of the United Nations and other international development agencies. He also represented First Nations, municipalities, small businesses and non-profits on environmental and corporate legal matters within this riding, throughout British Columbia and around the world.

Political career 
During the 2019 election, he referred to himself as a champion of the Liberal government's Pan-Canadian Framework on Clean Growth and Climate Change and promised to build on this ground-breaking plan to ensure that Canadian business will seize on the immense economic opportunities in the transition to a clean economy of the 21st century and that Canada meets its obligations under the Paris Agreement.

Patrick sits on the Standing Committee on Government Operations and Estimates, as well as the Standing Committee on Natural Resources.

On July 3, 2020, Weiler announced a $49 million investment from the federal government in infrastructure projects across northern BC and in West Vancouver—Sunshine Coast—Sea to Sky Country to support municipalities, Indigenous communities and not-for-profits in the COVID-19 recovery effort.

Electoral record

References

External links

Living people
1986 births
People from West Vancouver
Canadian people of Ukrainian descent
Liberal Party of Canada MPs
Members of the House of Commons of Canada from British Columbia
Lawyers in British Columbia
Peter A. Allard School of Law alumni
McGill University alumni
21st-century Canadian politicians